Shag Rock are an Australian indie-rock group formed in 2011, but according to the band themselves, began being “serious" in 2015. The group's name refers to a rock off North Stradbroke Island, where they went to frequently as children.

In early 2015, Shag Rock were signed to the independent label Airlock Records, founded by Powderfinger's Ian Haug and in April 2015, released their debut self-titled EP.

In 2016, Shag Rock released the singles "Roadtrip" and "Sunbleached Girl" ahead of their debut studio album Barefoot in February 2017.

In 2021, Tayla Young joined the group.
In July 2021, Shag Rock released their second studio album Double Overhead to which  Jacob Reed said it “explores mental health, which hopefully encourages people to be in touch with their feelings, chat to their mates and normalise being emotionally vulnerable 
It was nominated for Queensland Album of the Year in 2022.

Members
List of group members:

Current members
 Jacob Reed – vocals and guitar
 Alex Wilson – vocals, base and guitar
 Nick Cavdarski – bass and guidat
 Max Rose – Drums
 Tayla Young (since 2021) – vocals

Former members
 Chris Dudurovic (until 2015) – keyboards

Discography

Albums

Extended plays

Certified singles

References

Australian indie pop groups
Musical groups established in 2011
Musical groups from Brisbane